Kabir Mohabbat was an Afghan-American businessman born in Kabul, Afghanistan. He got his education from St. Louis, Missouri, and then moved to Houston, Texas, where he resided until his death.

Biography

Early life and education
He was born in Kabul on 10th October 1956, to a prominent and politically active Afghan family. After graduating from high school in Afghanistan, his family sent him to the United States to improve his skills in English and to get a university degree.

Afghan War
In 1979, within days of receiving a B.A. in political science from Southeast Missouri State University, the Soviet Army invaded Afghanistan. He immediately volunteered to fight and returned to Afghanistan. During the war, he had extensive involvement with various Afghan Mujahideen groups and supporting governments in their struggle with the Soviets. After the bombing of the USS Cole, he was asked by the U.S. to assist them in operations against the Taliban and Osama bin Laden.

Envoy
Mohabbat acted as a temporary envoy of the United States to the Taliban in the negotiations for the delivery of Osama bin Laden.  It was his responsibility to facilitate talks and act as an intermediary between the two governments. He succeeded in the negotiations. Toward the end of February 2001, the Taliban curbed any and all activities with bin Laden, they stripped him of his communications equipment, and limited his contacts to those of his "immediate refugee life" in Afghanistan. When the Taliban placed bin Laden and some of his men under house arrest near Kandahar, the U.S. was granted permission to arrest, capture or kill the Saudi on Afghan soil. The Afghan Government's representative even suggested that the U.S. hit bin Laden and his men with Cruise Missiles since the U.S. had fired them at Afghanistan once before.

Although invited, the U.S. did not act. Instead Mohabbat was flown to Afghanistan time after time to apologise for the U.S. Government's inability to act. Toward the end of these missions, he asked U.S. authorities if the problem was the cost of fuel for the Cruise Missiles and he volunteered to pay for it. The last time Mohabbat was sent into Taliban territory at the behest of the U.S. Government was August 2001.

Pakistan
On 9/11 Mohabbat happened to be in Pakistan. He was asked by the U.S. to help negotiate the surrender of Osama bin Laden and the Afghan Government, but the U.S. demanded that bin Laden be turned over within 24 hours. The Afghans argued that it was an impossible task since bin Laden had an army on their soil protecting him. They asked for a week to capture bin Laden and his men, but U.S. negotiators refused.

Several days later, when a representative of the Afghan Government called Mohabbat and surrendered to the U.S., Mohabbat immediately called U.S. authorities and explained that the Taliban had capitulated to all U.S. demands. The response from U.S. authorities: "I will convey your message, but I am afraid that the train has already left the station." To Mohabbat's sorrow, within days Afghanistan was bombed and the war began.

Sometime thereafter, Mohabbat was asked to become President of Afghanistan, but he refused. He replied that, in all conscience, he could not work solely for Afghanistan or the United States. He loved both countries and said, "I would be caught in the middle between two stubborn mules."

Negotiations
A history of Mohabbat's negotiations with the Taliban is documented in his biography, Delivering Osama. Extensive original documents that support Mohabbat's life story are in his book.

Death
Kabir Mohabbat died of a coronary event in Houston in 2007.

References

1956 births
2007 deaths